Cuautitlán is a commuter railway station serving the Ferrocarril Suburbano, a suburban rail that connects the State of Mexico with Mexico City. The station is located in the municipality of Cuautitlán, State of Mexico, north of Mexico City.

General information
Cuautitlán station is located in the Paseos de Cuautitlán neighborhood in Cuautitlán and it is the seventh and last station of the system going northbound from Buenavista.

History

Cuautitlán station was opened on 5 January 2009 as part of the second stretch of system 1 of the Ferrocarril Suburbano, going towards Buenavista Station in Mexico City. On 1 April 2019, seven people robbed the station's ticket office.

Station layout

References

2009 establishments in Mexico
Cuautitlán
Cuautitlán
Railway stations opened in 2009
Buildings and structures in the State of Mexico